Liam Anthony (born 9 September 1987) is an Australian rules footballer who played for the North Melbourne Football Club in the Australian Football League (AFL).

Originally from Geraldton, Western Australia, he was recruited from the East Fremantle in WAFL to North Melbourne with the 43rd selection in the 2008 AFL Draft.  His career to date has been plagued by injuries, with a stress fracture in his foot delaying his AFL debut until halfway through the 2009 season, a severed finger tendon interrupting his 2010 pre-season and dislocating his shoulder during the 2010 season.

In Anthony's senior AFL debut for North Melbourne in Round 13 2009, he gathered 28 possessions. He played every game for the rest of the year, averaging 25 disposals per game.

On 31 October 2014 it was announced that Anthony had been delisted by the North Melbourne Football Club.

References

External links 

1987 births
North Melbourne Football Club players
Living people
East Fremantle Football Club players
North Ballarat Football Club players
Australian rules footballers from Geraldton